Silvio Horta (August 14, 1974 – January 7, 2020) was an American screenwriter and television producer widely noted for adapting the hit Colombian telenovela Yo soy Betty, la fea into the ABC series Ugly Betty. Horta served as head writer and executive producer on the series.

Background and death
Horta, a first-generation Cuban-American, was born and raised in Miami. He was a popular performer and playwright in high school, attending both International Baccalaureate Theater, and Experimental Theater programs at Coral Gables Senior in Miami. After graduating in 1992, he attended the Tisch School of the Arts at New York University, majoring in film. Horta was openly gay, coming out to his family at 19.

He was found dead in a Miami hotel room on January 7, 2020.  Variety reported that he died from a self-inflicted gunshot wound. He was 45 years old.

Career
Horta penned many as yet unproduced screenplays including "Even Exchange" and "The Furies" (with Nip/Tuck creator Ryan Murphy). Prior to Ugly Betty, Horta wrote the screenplay for the 1998 teen satirical hit slasher film Urban Legend and he can be heard on the DVD commentary.  Before Legend, he was working as a perfume spritzer.

Horta was also creator of two short lived sci-fi television shows Jake 2.0, which starred Christopher Gorham, who would later join the cast of Ugly Betty, and The Chronicle. In 2007, he accepted the Golden Globe for Best Comedy Series Ugly Betty, stating, "Like most of us up here, Betty is an immigrant and The American Dream is alive and well and in reach of anybody who wants it".

Horta started the production company "Silent H Productions", named as a tongue-in-cheek acknowledgement of the common mispronunciation of the silent H in Horta's last name. In 2011, his production company signed a deal with Sony.

Filmography

Crew

References

External links

1974 births
2020 deaths
2020 suicides
American television producers
American television writers
American writers of Cuban descent
American gay writers
LGBT Hispanic and Latino American people
LGBT people from Florida
LGBT producers
American LGBT screenwriters
American male television writers
Screenwriters from Florida
Showrunners
Suicides by firearm in Florida
Tisch School of the Arts alumni
Writers Guild of America Award winners
Writers from Miami